Michael Harwood (1934, in Boston – 24 November 1989, in San Diego) was a naturalist, environmentalist, and author.

Harwood received his secondary education from The Putney School in Vermont and graduated from Harvard University in 1956. He became the third husband of the author Mary B. Durant in 1966.

He was a co-winner of the 1981 John Burroughs Medal for On the Road With John James Audubon, which he co-authored with his wife Mary Durant. The book is organized as a travel journal which recounts how the two authors spent more than a year camping along the various North American itineraries recorded in Audubon's journals.

Harwood attended the 1974 foundational meeting and was a president of the Hawk Migration Association of North America. He was a member of the board of the Hawk Mountain Sanctuary at Kempton, Pennsylvania.

Selected publications

with Mary B. Durant: 
with Eliot Porter: 

with  Mary B. Durant:

References

1934 births
1989 deaths
Harvard University alumni
American naturalists
American non-fiction environmental writers
John Burroughs Medal recipients
American nature writers
American male non-fiction writers
20th-century naturalists